Chasing Time may refer to:

 Chasing Time (Fates Warning album), a compilation album by Fates Warning
 Chasing Time: The Bedlam Sessions, a live album and DVD released by James Blunt in 2006
 Chasing Time (TV series), a UK television series that ran between 2001 and 2003
 "Chasing Time" (song), a song by Azealia Banks